Louisiana's 4th State Senate district is one of 39 districts in the Louisiana State Senate. It has been represented by Democrat Jimmy Harris since 2020, succeeding retiring fellow Democrat Wesley Bishop.

Geography
District 4 is located entirely within New Orleans, including parts of Mid-City, Lakeview, Gentilly, the French Quarter, Tremé, and New Orleans East.

The district overlaps with Louisiana's 1st and 2nd congressional districts, and with the 93rd, 94th, 97th, 99th, and 100th districts of the Louisiana House of Representatives.

Recent election results
Louisiana uses a jungle primary system. If no candidate receives 50% in the first round of voting, when all candidates appear on the same ballot regardless of party, the top-two finishers advance to a runoff election.

2019

2015

2011

Federal and statewide results in District 4

References

Louisiana State Senate districts
Orleans Parish, Louisiana